Asafo-Akyem is a town in the Eastern Region of Ghana. The town was the initial place where Abuakwa State College was established before it was moved to its permanent place in Kibi.

References

Populated places in the Eastern Region (Ghana)